Chicoreus zululandensis is a species of sea snail, a marine gastropod mollusk in the family Muricidae, the murex snails or rock snails.

Description
It shows many visible similarities with Chicorius palmarosae and Chicorius banksii. A South Africa report said that it could measure approximately 28 mm.
It is dark red with light-colored yellow lines.

Distribution
Its scientific name, Chicorius zululadensis, comes from the fact that it is only found in South Africa, specifically near the Zulula town.

References

Chicoreus
Gastropods described in 1989